"Solo" is a song by British electronic music band Clean Bandit, featuring guest vocals from American singer Demi Lovato and pitched backing vocals from Kamille. It was written by Lovato, Kamille, Grace Chatto, Fred Gibson and Jack Patterson, and was produced by Chatto, Gibson, Patterson and Mark Ralph. The song was released on 18 May 2018 by Atlantic Records.

"Solo" was a worldwide hit. It topped the charts in thirteen countries, earned Diamond certifications in France and Poland, and went platinum in Australia, Austria, Belgium, Canada, Denmark, Germany, Italy, Portugal, Spain, the United Kingdom, and the United States.

"Solo" was the most searched song on Shazam in 2018, with 9.1 million tags worldwide.

Background
The song was first revealed when a dancer posted on her Instagram Stories that she was starring in a Clean Bandit and Demi Lovato music video. Clean Bandit teased the song on 10 May 2018, writing on Instagram and Twitter: "Really excited to announce our new single Solo with Demi Lovato will be out 18/05." The announcement came with the song's cover art. Camille Purcell also disclosed in a tweet that she has been involved in the making of "Solo".

Grace Chatto of Clean Bandit told the London Evening Standard that "Solo" was based on her own experience with a "difficult break-up". She also revealed that the song was recorded over FaceTime because the band was unable to schedule a studio session with Lovato. "It was crazy. She was in Alabama in a studio and we were over here. You know when the connection is bad and the speed fluctuates? We couldn't hear that well, but it turned out really well."

Composition
"Solo" is an upbeat EDM song about self-love in spite of a heartbreak. It is performed in the key of B minor in common time with a tempo of 105 beats per minute, following a progression of Bm–A–Fm–G and Bm–A–D–G, and Lovato's vocals span from A3 to D5. Described as a "summer anthem", it opens with a "buoyant production". The chorus consists of a mix of synth and vocoder effects, and it bears a resemblance to Rita Ora's "Anywhere".

Commercial performance
"Solo" reached number one in the United Kingdom, becoming Clean Bandit's fourth UK chart-topper and Lovato's first number-one song in the nation. In Australia, the song has reached number 7, giving Clean Bandit their fourth and Lovato their second top 10 entry in the country. It additionally peaked at number one in Austria, the Czech Republic, Finland, Germany, Hungary, Ireland, Lithuania, Poland, Russia and Slovakia, as well as the top ten in Australia, Belgium, Croatia, Denmark, France, Greece, Latvia, Lebanon, Norway, Portugal, Romania, Scotland, Singapore, Slovenia, Sweden, and Switzerland.

Live performances
The song was added to the set list of the European leg of Lovato's Tell Me You Love Me World Tour. Clean Bandit performed the song during their set at the Capital FM Summertime Ball along with Lovato as a special guest on 9 June 2018.

Music videos
The music video was released on 31 May 2018, starring the members of Clean Bandit and Demi Lovato. The video follows Clean Bandit's Grace Chatto and a "lover", actor George Todd McLachlan as they argue. As the arguments become violent, Chatto grabs her longboard and skates into town where she ends up at a laundromat. Hidden behind the washing machines in an office, she pays an attendant (Ko Hyojoo) for an unknown concoction. The video then follows Hyojoo, who skates with a longboard down the road, to retrieve this medicine which is being made for her by Jack and Luke Patterson. Before that, Luke suggests choosing the shape of a bearded dragon or a rabbit. Then they make a decision to choose the shape of a dog. In the end, with the help of the medicine, Chatto turns her abusive partner into a rainbow golden Labrador puppy. The video is briefly intercut with images of Chatto lying on a bed and a sun lounger with her face seemingly evaporating. Lovato makes brief appearances throughout in a floral top as she sings the track's vocals. As of November 2021, the music video has garnered over 900 million views on YouTube. A black and white acoustic version of the video was released on 15 June 2018.

On 17 August 2018, a Japanese version of the video was released. This video was filmed in Kyoto and focuses on the dichotomy of trying to break away one's feelings and moving on from the past with the inner turmoil that comes along with it. The music video features a popular local dancer named Nana from the dance unit KiKiRara. Nana portrays the feeling of wanting to break away (dressed as a Maiko) as well as the feeling of wanting to hang on, portrayed as a-lady-in-a-black-costume. This music video was filmed in Japan's historical tourist sites in Kyoto, Japan. It was directed by Yutaka Obara.

Track listing

Digital download
"Solo" (featuring Demi Lovato)  – 3:42

Digital download – Wideboys remix
"Solo" (featuring Demi Lovato) (Wideboys remix)  – 3:08

Digital download – acoustic version
"Solo" (featuring Demi Lovato) (acoustic)  – 3:45

Digital download – Ofenbach remix
"Solo" (featuring Demi Lovato) (Ofenbach remix)  – 3:48

Digital download – Sofi Tukker remix
"Solo" (featuring Demi Lovato) (Sofi Tukker remix)  – 3:24

Digital download – M-22 remix
"Solo" (featuring Demi Lovato) (M-22 remix)  – 5:15

Digital download – Latin remix
"Solo" (featuring Demi Lovato) (Latin remix)  – 3:42

Digital download – Yxng Bane remix
"Solo" (featuring Demi Lovato) (Yxng Bane remix)  – 3:41

Digital download – Seeb remix
"Solo" (featuring Demi Lovato) (Seeb remix)  – 3:14

Credits and personnel
Credits adapted from Tidal and YouTube.

 Demi Lovato – vocals, songwriting
 Camille Purcell – backing vocals, songwriting
 Grace Chatto – production, songwriting, cello, mixing
 Jack Patterson – production, songwriting, guitar, mixing, synthesizer
 Fred – production, songwriting, keyboard, drum programming, synthesizer
 Mark Ralph – production, mixing
 Tom AD Fuller – mix engineering
 Stuart Hawkes – master engineering
 Mitch Allan – engineering
 Mike Horner – engineering
 Luke Patterson – percussion
 James Boyd – viola
 Beatrice Philips – violin
 Stephanie Benedetti – violin
 Scott Cutler – songwriting 
 Anne Preven – songwriting

Charts

Weekly charts

Year-end charts

Certifications

Release history

References

External links
 

2018 singles
2018 songs
2010s ballads
Atlantic Records singles
Clean Bandit songs
Demi Lovato songs
Electropop ballads
Number-one singles in Austria
Ultratop 50 Singles (Wallonia) number-one singles
Number-one singles in Finland
Number-one singles in Germany
Irish Singles Chart number-one singles
Number-one singles in Israel
Number-one singles in Russia
Number-one singles in Poland
Pop ballads
Songs written by Kamille (musician)
Songs written by Demi Lovato
Songs written by Grace Chatto
Songs written by Jack Patterson (Clean Bandit)
Electronic dance music songs
UK Singles Chart number-one singles
Songs written by Fred Again
Black-and-white music videos
Song recordings produced by Mark Ralph (record producer)